The 1954 South Carolina Gamecocks football team represented the University of South Carolina as a member of the Atlantic Coast Conference (ACC) during the 1954 college football season. Led by 14th-year head coach Rex Enright, the Gamecocks compiled an overall record of 6–4 with a mark of 3–3 in conference play, placing fourth in the ACC. The team played home games at Carolina Stadium in Columbia, South Carolina. The season opened with a defeat of Army.

Schedule

References

South Carolina
South Carolina Gamecocks football seasons
South Carolina Gamecocks football